Plas Cwmcynfelin is a house standing in its own grounds overlooking the village of Llangorwen, near Aberystwyth, Wales. A Grade II listed building , it is now home to the Plas Cwmcynfelin Care Home.

History
In the 1700s the estate was owned by Matthew Davies, the High Sheriff of Cardiganshire for 1790. It descended in the family until it was divided between two sisters and was inherited by the Rev. Isaac Williams, a prominent member of the Oxford Movement.

Notable residents
 J. H. Davies (1871–1926), lawyer, bibliographer and educationist
 Tom Macdonald (1900–1980), journalist and novelist
 Rev. Isaac Williams (1802–1865), clergyman and  lecturer at Oxford

References

External links
 Inspector's Report 28 September 2008
picture
picture

Buildings and structures in Aberystwyth
Country houses in Ceredigion
Grade II listed buildings in Ceredigion